Hilla Nachshon (or Hila, ; born ) is an Israeli television host, actress and former model.

Early life 
Nachshon was born in Kiryat Bialik, Israel, to a family of Ashkenazi Jewish (Polish-Jewish) descent. Her father is Yosef Nahshon (originally Yosef Zilberman), and her mother is Tamar (née Rotem). Nachshon grew up in Kiryat Haroshet. She has one younger sister and a set of twin brothers.

In the late 1990s Nachshon served as a soldier in the Military Police Corps of the Israel Defense Forces.

Career 
Nachshon initially gained fame as a model. In 2003 Nachshon participated in the musical The Little Prince. Later on she appeared in TV commercials for the popular Israeli dairy pudding Milky and for the Israeli fashion brand Tamnun.

As a result of her success, in 2005 Nachshon began to host the entertainment show Y on ten (Y בעשר) on the broadcasts of the satellite television provider Yes, initially alongside Michael Hanegbi and later alongside Aviad Kisos. That year she also played a cameo role in the daily TV drama HaShir Shelanu. Also in that year, she began to host the Israeli version of the reality show Dancing with the Stars on the Israeli channel 2, along with Avi Kushnir. In 2010 and in 2011 Nachshon hosted the Miss Israel beauty pageant competition.

In 2016, she played Havatzelet in HOT's comedy series Shutafim.

Personal life 
Her first marriage was to Israeli Premier League footballer Asi Domb between the years 2004 and 2006.

In 2007 She began a high-profile relationship with model Yonatan Cohen. At that time, she moved in with Cohen to moshav Beit Nekofa. On 31 March 2008 their daughter was born. They separated in 2011.

Her second marriage was to Israeli businessman Eyal Hassid between 2013 and 2015. They had a son in 2013.

Nachshon resided with her children in Kadima, Israel, although she recently returned to Tel Aviv.

References

External links 
 

1980 births
Association footballers' wives and girlfriends
Israeli female models
Israeli television actresses
Jewish Israeli actresses
Living people
People from Kiryat Bialik
People from Kiryat Tiv'on
Infotainers
Beauty pageant hosts
Israeli people of Polish-Jewish descent
Israeli Ashkenazi Jews